Myiornis is a bird genus in the family Tyrannidae. Discounting the hummingbirds, they are some of the smallest birds in the world.

The genus contains four species:

References

 
Higher-level bird taxa restricted to the Neotropics
Taxonomy articles created by Polbot